The 1965–66 English football season was Aston Villa's 66th season in the Football League, this season playing in the Football League First Division. Villa finished 16th, below Arsenal and Newcastle United and just above Sheffield Wednesday and Nottingham Forest.

Football League First Division

Diary of the season
4 Sep 1965: Villa, bottom of the table with a single point, pick up their first win, 0–2 away to Blackburn.

19 Mar 1966: Tony Hateley scores four second-half goals as Villa came from 5–1 down to draw 5–5 with Tottenham Hotspur.

9 May 1966: Villa are trounced 1–6 away to Manchester United.

Results

First team squad
  Colin Withers, Goalkeeper, 25
  John Gavan, Goalkeeper, 25 
  John Sleeuwenhoek, Centre-Back, 21
  Charlie Aitken, Left-Back, 23 
  Mick Wright, Right-Back, 18
  Keith Bradley, Right-Back, 19
  Graham Parker, Midfielder, 19 
  Alan Deakin, Midfielder, 23 
  Ray Bloomfield, Midfielder, 20 
  Mike Tindall, Defensive Midfield, 24 
  Bobby Park, Central Midfield, 18
  Lew Chatterley, Central Midfield, 20
  Johnny MacLeod, Right Midfield, 26 
  Dave Pountney, Right Midfield, 25 
  Tony Scott, Left Midfield, 24
  Willie Hamilton, Forward, 27 
  Jimmy MacEwan, Right Winger, 36 
  Alan Baker, Second Striker, 21
  Barry Stobart, Second Striker, 27 
  Phil Woosnam, Centre-Forward, 32 
  Tony Hateley, Centre-Forward, 24

References

Aston Villa F.C. seasons
Aston Villa F.C. season